Marissa Lourdes Mercado Andaya (born Marissa Lourdes Lirio Mercado; March 7, 1969 – July 5, 2020) was a Filipina politician who served as congresswoman for Camarines Sur's 1st congressional district from 2019 until her death in 2020.

Personal life and death 
Mercado-Andaya born on 7 March 1969 she married Rolando Andaya Jr. and they had two children named Rolando IV ("Ranton") and Katrina.

In 2019 elections she run as Congresswoman of Camarines Sur's 1st District and won by 61,480 votes out of 29,228 votes of elections.

Illness and death 
Mercado-Andaya diagnosed with cancer, but in 2020, the symptoms came back. On July 5, 2020, Mercado-Andaya died at the age of 51 in Naga City, Camarines Sur the death announced by her husband Rolando Andaya Jr. and her children.

Notes

References 

1969 births
2020 deaths
Members of the House of Representatives of the Philippines from Camarines Sur
People from Camarines Sur
Nationalist People's Coalition politicians